Kribi killi (Fundulopanchax fallax) is a species of African killifish that mainly inhabits swamps and turbid parts of brooks in the coastal rainforest. The species is endemic to Cameroon. Breeding pairs of the species most often lay their eggs over the bottom, but occasionally also among the roots of free-floating aquatic plants. Pairs stay close for some time, with just a few eggs being produced each day. It is sometimes kept in captivity but difficult to maintain and breed in an aquarium.

References 

kribi killi
Fish of Cameroon
Endemic fauna of Cameroon
kribi killi